Karsten Troyke (born Karsten Bertolt Sellhorn on 14 August 1960 in Berlin) is a German singer of Jewish songs, as well as an actor and speaker.

Early life 
Troyke was born to a non-Jewish family, though his father Werner "Josh" Sellhorn had a Jewish father, who hid the family tree from officials by buying then-illegal "Aryan papers“.

Troyke worked in various jobs: as a gardener and with cognitively challenged children. He studied singing (with Leonore Gendries) as well as drama and speaking, performing on stage since 1982.

Career
In 1990 he gave up work to dedicate himself full-time to musical performance and theater. Troyke participated in radio plays, worked as a voice actor (dubbing), and appeared in various stage plays.

As a singer, his album Yiddish Anders (1992) received the praise of German record critics. Jidische Vergessene Lieder (1997) contained previously unpublished songs of Sara Bialas Tenenberg, who became his mentor for the Yiddish language.

In his performances, Troyke worked with Bettina Wegner, Suzanna and the Trio Scho. His interpretations of the songs of Georg Kreisler received mention in the writer-musician's 2005 biography. In 2006, two documentaries, Yiddish Soul and Concert Yiddish Soul, featured Troyke, Shura Lipovsky, Myriam Fuks, and The KlezRoym.

Troyke holds workshops on interpreting Yiddish songs and teaches rare songs from his collection. He was a guest professor at the Jewish Music Institute of School of Oriental and African Studies (SOAS), London, at Carleton College Northfield (Minnesota) and at the summer school of Centre Medem, Paris.

Work

Books 
 Fritz Mordechai Kaufmann Die schoensten Lieder der Ostjuden, reprint from Berlin 1920 (2001), with translations by Karsten Troyke

Recordings 

 1991 Shuloym Alaykhem (1991)
 1992 Yiddish Anders (Hermann Anders - Band)
 1994 Leg den Kopf auf meine Knie, with writings of Selma Meerbaum-Eisinger, Itzik Manger und Abraham Sutzkever
 1996 Grüne Blätter
 1997 Jidische Vergessene Lieder
 1999 Shuloym Alaykhem - The Old Yiddish Songs
 1998 Troyke singt Kreisler
 2001 Chanson Total with Suzanna
 2005 Grüne Blätter (remastered)
 2006 Tango Oyf Yiddish
 2011: Unser war die Nacht (Troyke, Suzanna & Trio Scho), iTunes edition only
 2012: Live - Klezmer Konzert (Troyke, Trio Scho), iTunes edition only
 2012 Tango Oyf Yiddish Vol.2, Oriente Musik
 2014 Yiddish Troubadour, Raumer Records
 2015 Zol Zayn - Yiddish Songs, (Troyke & Daniel Weltlinger), Rectify Records
 2015 Ich kann tanzen, (Troyke & Daniel Weltlinger), Rectify Records

In collaboration:
 1993 Tu Balval, Suzanna
 1994 Váci Utca, Peter M. Haas, Martin Frisch
 1995 T&FF Rudolstadt '94
 1997 Diadromes, Alec Kopyt & Poza (klezmer and Gypsy music)
 1998 Dui Dui, Suzanna
 1999 Jazz Lyrik Prosa II
 1999 Old Russian Popsongs, Trio Scho
 1999 Wege, Bettina Wegner
 2000 Mit Josh um halb acht, reading of Josh Sellhorn
 2000 Lachen und lachen lassen
 2001 Schlaf schneller, Genosse, Ursula Karusseit, Günther Junghans, Trio Scho
 2001 Alles, was ich wünsche, Bettina Wegner
 2002 Schweineparadies, Die Bösen Mädchen
 2003 Mein Bruder, Bettina Wegner
 2004 Liebeslieder, Bettina Wegner
 2005 Jazz Lyrik Prosa III
 2005 Der Entenkönig, a radio play
 2008: a Spil af Yiddish, Mark Aizikovitch
 2008: Abschiedstournee, Bettina Wegner
 2009: Sol Sajn: Jiddische Musik in Deutschland und ihre Einflüsse (Yiddish Music in Germany and Its Influences) (Troyke Vol.2 and Vol.4), Bear Family
 2015 Lauter Liebeslieder, Suzanna & friends

External links 
 Karsten Troyke homepage
 Karsten Troyke on Myspace
 Raumer Records (CDs by Karsten Troyke)

References

1960 births
Living people
Singers from Berlin
Yiddish-language singers
German male singers